Dorthe Holm (born 3 July 1972) is a Danish curler from Kastrup.

Career
Holm skipped the Danish women's team at the 2006 Winter Olympics. The team were the only athletes Denmark sent to the games, as such Holm carried the flag for Denmark in the opening ceremonies.

Holm has had a long curling career, which internationally began in 1987 at the European Junior Championships. By 1994, Holm had competed in six World Junior Curling Championships, winning bronze in 1993 and 1994. She skipped Denmark in 1993, and was the third for Angelina Jensen in 1994. At the 1992 Winter Olympics she was an alternate for the Danish team, when curling was just a demonstration event. The team finished in fourth place.

In 1994, Denmark won the European Curling Championships, and Holm played third for the team that was skipped by Helena Blach Lavrsen. After three unsuccessful trips to the World Curling Championships, Holm finally won a medal in 1997, a bronze, when she played second for Blach Lavrsen. She moved up to third later in the year, and won a silver at the European Championships. That same season she was playing second again, and she picked up a silver medal at curling's debut at the 1998 Winter Olympics. She also won a silver at that year's World Championships, followed by a bronze at the European Championships, as a third once again.

Holm wouldn't return to the international scene until 2002, at this point she was skipping the Danish team. As skip she won a silver at the 2002 European Championships, and a bronze in the 2003 and 2005 European Championships. At the 2006 Olympics, Denmark placed 8th.

Awards
 1991 - WJCC All-Star, Skip 
 1994 - WJCC All-Star, Third 
 1991 - WJCC Sportsmanship Award 
 1993 - WJCC Sportsmanship Award

External links

Danish female curlers
Curlers at the 2006 Winter Olympics
1972 births
Living people
Curlers at the 1992 Winter Olympics
Curlers at the 1998 Winter Olympics
Holm
Olympic silver medalists for Denmark
Olympic medalists in curling
People from Tårnby Municipality
Medalists at the 1998 Winter Olympics
European curling champions
Sportspeople from the Capital Region of Denmark
20th-century Danish women
21st-century Danish women